Statesville is a city in and the county seat of Iredell County, North Carolina, United States, and it is part of the Charlotte metropolitan area. Statesville was established in 1789 by an act of the North Carolina Legislature. The population was recorded as 95 in the 1800 Census. The population was 28,419 at the time of the 2020 census.

History 
In 1753, Scots-Irish Presbyterians and German Lutherans, who had originally settled in Pennsylvania, began arriving in what would become Statesville in 1789 to plant crops in the fertile soil where game and water were also plentiful. The settlement, known as Fourth Creek Congregation, was named for the freshwater stream running to the north of the present-day city center, the fourth creek west of the neighboring settlement of Salisbury. The center of the settlement was a log cabin where the Presbyterians worshiped and where the First Presbyterian Church is located today.

In 1755, colonial governor Arthur Dobbs authorized the construction of the colony's frontier fort, which was located approximately  due north of the Fourth Creek settlement. Built and garrisoned by North Carolina provincial soldiers, Fort Dobbs defended British North America's western frontier in the colony of North Carolina during the French and Indian War and Anglo-Cherokee War. Fort Dobbs combined the functions of a military barracks, fortification, refuge for settlers, provisioning depot and center for negotiations with Native Americans.

The state legislature divided Rowan County in 1788, and the new county was named "Iredell" for James Iredell, associate justice of the first Supreme Court during the presidency of George Washington.

One year later, the legislature selected a spot for the county seat. The Fourth Creek Congregation was chosen, and the settlement became known as "Statesville". The 1800 US Census lists the town as "States Ville", which was later combined as "Statesville". In 1800, there were 95 inhabitants in "States Ville", including 68 free white persons and 27 slaves.
 
As early as 1833, Statesville's leaders began laying track for railroads to connect the Piedmont area of North Carolina with the rest of the country.

By 1858, Statesville was growing rapidly and soon afterward began leading the state in the production of tobacco and tobacco products, the manufacture and blending of whiskey, and became a large distribution center for roots and herbs.

On August 27, 1891, a passenger train derailed on a  bridge, and seven cars fell down. About 30 people died in the accident.

Geography
Statesville is in central Iredell County, in the western part of the Piedmont region of North Carolina.

The north side of Statesville is drained by Fourth Creek, while the south side is drained by Third Creek. Both creeks flow east, joining just before reaching the South Yadkin River near Cooleemee.

Climate
Statesville has a humid subtropical climate (Cfa) like most of the state of North Carolina, although its higher elevation leads to cooler temperatures than much of the Piedmont. Summers are generally hot and humid, with mild nights, while winters are usually cool with chilly nights and sporadic snowfall. Severe thunderstorms can be an issue during summer, with wind speeds of 60 mph and even gusts of 95 mph being recorded during these storms.

Demographics

2020 census

As of the 2020 United States census, there were 28,419 people, 10,628 households, and 6,536 families residing in the city.

2010 census
As of the census of 2010, there were 24,633 people, 9,338 households, and 5,957 families residing in the city. The population density was 1,195.8 people per square mile (438.6/km). There were 10,041 housing units at an average density of 489.1 per square mile (188.8/km). The racial composition of the city was: 59.94% White, 31.87% Black or African American, 7.11% Hispanic or Latino American, 2.71% Asian American, 0.18% Native American, 0.02% Native Hawaiian or Other Pacific Islander, 3.84% some other races, and 1.42% two or more races.

There were 9,338 households, out of which 28.1% had children under the age of 18 living with them, 41.7% were married couples living together, 17.9% had a female householder with no husband present, and 36.2% were non-families. 31.4% of all households were made up of individuals, and 12.7% had someone living alone who was 65 years of age or older. The average household size was 2.39 and the average family size was 2.99.

In the city, the population was spread out, with 24.4% under the age of 18, 8.7% from 18 to 24, 28.0% from 25 to 44, 21.4% from 45 to 64, and 17.4% who were 65 years of age or older. The median age was 37 years. For every 100 females, there were 86.5 males. For every 100 females age 18 and over, there were 82.0 males.

The median income for a household in the city was $31,925, and the median income for a family was $41,694. Males had a median income of $31,255 versus $22,490 for females. The per capita income for the city was $19,328. About 12.7% of families and 16.1% of the population were below the poverty line, including 23.7% of those under age 18 and 13.8% of those age 65 or over.

Arts and culture

Historic sites

 Academy Hill Historic District
 Center Street A.M.E. Zion Church, built in 1903
 Congregation Emanuel is one of fewer than a hundred nineteenth-century synagogue buildings still standing in the United States.
 East Broad Street–Davie Avenue Historic District
 Fourth Creek Burial Ground, burials from 1759
 Iredell County Courthouse, built in 1899
 Key Memorial Chapel, also known as St. Philips Roman Catholic Church, built in 1898
 Main Building, Mitchell College, built in 1854-1856
 McElwee Houses, built in the late 1800s and early 1900s
 Mitchell College Historic District, buildings dating from 1857 to 1930
 Morrison-Mott House, built about 1904 to 1905
 Col. Silas Alexander Sharpe House, built about 1860 or 1865
 South Race Street Historic District, 85 buildings built in the late 1800s and early 1900s
 Statesville Commercial Historic District, 54 buildings built between 1875 and 1925
 Henry Turner House and Caldwell–Turner Mill Site, built about 1860
 United States Post Office and County Courthouse, built in 1891

Museums
The Governor Zebulon Vance House and Museum is operated by the United Daughters of the Confederacy; Vance lived in the house at the end of the U.S. Civil War. Other museums include Iredell Museums, Heritage Museum, and The Children's Museum.

Sports
Statesville was home to a minor league baseball teams of various names, mainly the Statesville Owls, from 1939 until 1969. They played in several leagues over the years including the Tar Heel League (1939–1940), North Carolina State League (1942, 1947–1952), Western Carolina League (1960–1962), and Western Carolinas League (1963–1969). They were league champions in their respective league in 1940, 1948, and 1962. The field was located at Statesville Senior High School and thus named Senior High Stadium.

Education
The city is part of the Iredell–Statesville School District. Schools within the city limits include East Iredell Elementary, N.B. Mills Elementary, Northview School, Pressly Elementary, and Statesville Middle School, and Statesville High School. Schools serving Statesville residents but located outside the city limits include Cloverleaf Elementary School, East Iredell Middle School, and Third Creek Elementary School.

Wayside Elementary School was an elementary school located off Salisbury Road in eastern Statesville. The current school building opened in 1941 and closed in 2002 when Wayside School and Alan D. Rutherford School merged to form Third Creek Elementary. The former Wayside building is currently home to the UAW 3520 headquarters, while the former Alan D. Rutherford site is home to the Iredell-Statesville Schools Administrative Annex, now known as the Alan D. Rutherford Education Building.

Statesville Christian School is a non-denominational K4–12 private school serving the greater Statesville area.

Mitchell Community College, founded as a Presbyterian women's college in 1852, is now a public community college. In the 2008–2009 academic year, it became the first community college in the United States to be accepted into NASA's University Student Launch Initiative competition.

Media

Print
 The Statesville Record & Landmark is Statesville's daily newspaper, primarily serving Iredell County. It is published seven days a week.

Radio
 WAME, "Real Country 550 & 92.9" is an AM/FM station at 550 kHz and 92.9 mHz that plays classic country music.
 WSIC, 1400 AM & 100.7 FM, has a news-talk format.

In addition, the signals of many stations from the Charlotte area and Piedmont Triad region reach Statesville.

Infrastructure

Highways
Interstate 40 and Interstate 77 intersect in the northeastern part of the city, and  US 21, US 64, and US 70 run through the center of Statesville.

Notable people
 Gair Allie (1931–2016), former Major League Baseball player
 Julianne Baird (born 1952), soprano singer
 Breon Borders (born 1995), NFL defensive back
 Hayne D. Boyden (1897-1978), Naval aviator and Brigadier general, USMC
 Johnny Chapman (born 1967), stock car racing driver
 Louis Clarke (1901–1977), Olympic gold medal winner in 4x100 m relay
 Chris Cole (born 1982), professional skateboarder
 Blake Crouch (born 1978), author and producer 
 Jake Crum (born 1991), driver in the NASCAR Camping World Truck Series
 Mark Davidson (born 1961), former outfielder for the Minnesota Twins and Houston Astros
 Jerome Henderson (born 1969), NFL cornerback
 Columbus Vance Henkel, Jr. (1908–1971), five-term North Carolina Senator; editor of "The Blowing Rocket"
 Rockie Lynne (born 1964), country music artist
 Danny Malboeuf (born 1960), visual artist combining surrealism with other genres
 Thomas Marshburn (born 1960), NASA astronaut
 Barry Moore (born 1943), former Major League Baseball pitcher
 Justin Moose (born 1983), professional soccer player
 Ryan Newman (born 1977), NASCAR driver
 William Stevens Powell (1919–2015), historian, author, teacher, and librarian known for his extensive work on the history of North Carolina, lived in Statesville
 Stephen C. Reber, Archbishop of the United Episcopal Church of North America
 William Sharpe (1742–1818), lawyer, politician, American Revolution patriot, and a delegate to the Continental Congress
 Mike Skinner (born 1957), NASCAR driver
 Vinson Smith (born 1965), NFL linebacker
 Herm Starrette (1936–2017), former Major League Baseball pitcher and coach
 T.M. Stikeleather (1848–1934), populist representative in 1894 and 1900 for the 27th district, which included Iredell, Davie and Yadkin counties
 Theodore Taylor (1921–2006), writer
 Jared Watts (born 1992), Major League Soccer player

References

Cities in North Carolina
German-American culture in North Carolina
Scotch-Irish American culture in North Carolina
Cities in Iredell County, North Carolina
County seats in North Carolina
Populated places established in 1753
1753 establishments in North Carolina